A free church is a Christian denomination that is intrinsically separate from government (as opposed to a state church). A free church does not define government policy, and a free church does not accept church theology or policy definitions from the government. A free church also does not seek or receive government endorsements or funding to carry out its work. The term is especially relevant in countries with established state churches. An individual belonging to a free church is known as a free churchperson or, historically, a free churchman.

In Scandinavia, free churchpersons would include Christians who are not communicants of the majority national church, such as the Lutheran Church of Sweden.

In England, where the Church of England was the established church, other Protestant groups like Calvinists (Presbyterians and Congregationalists), Baptists, the Plymouth Brethren, Methodists and Quakers are among those counted as free churches.

History

The free church model is historically what the Christian church was before the Emperor Constantine legalized Christianity (see Early Christianity) and before the later setting up of the state church of the Roman Empire.

There were many thriving Christian communities in the Far East (India and China) during medieval times, yet none of these communities ever wielded control of a state.

Groups like the Waldensians were in practice free churches. In 16th century Europe, within the radical movements such as the Anabaptists were free churches with small exceptions like the Münster Rebellion. Mennonites, the Amish, the Quakers and other churches maintain free church polities into the present date both in Europe and in North America.

Free churches also evolved in the US supported by the official separation of church and state, while much of Europe maintains some government involvement in religion and churches via taxation to support them and by appointing ministers and bishops etc., although free churches have been founded in Europe outside of the state system.

By denomination

Anglicanism 
One church in England in the Anglican tradition, has used the name 'Free Church', known as the Free Church of England.
John Gifford had founded a free church in Bedford, England in 1650.

Presbyterianism 
Some churches in Scotland and Northern Ireland, mainly of the splinter off  Presbyterian tradition, have used the name 'Free Church'. The most important of these to persist at the present time is the Free Church of Scotland.The mainline  Church of Scotland is the national church which is Presbyterian and the mother kirk for Presbyterianism all over the world,  and is not part of the "Free Church".

English dissenters and nonconformists
In England and Wales in the late 19th century the new terms "free churchman" and "Free Church" started to replace "dissenter" or Nonconformist.

Free Methodist Church 

Among the Methodist Churches, calling a church "free" does not indicate any particular relation to a government.  Rather the Free Methodist Church is so called because of three, possibly four, reasons, depending on the source referenced. The word "Free" was suggested and adopted because the new church was to be an anti-slavery church (slavery was an issue in those days), because pews in the churches were to be free to all rather than sold or rented (as was common), and because the new church hoped for the freedom of the Holy Spirit in the services rather than a stifling formality.  However, according to World Book Encyclopedia, the third principle was "freedom" from secret and oathbound societies (in particular the Freemasons).

Radical Pietism 
Denominations belonging to the International Federation of Free Evangelical Churches trace their roots to the Radical Pietist movement. Radical Pietists separated from the Lutheran Churches, which held the status of state churches in Europe.

By country

United States 
In the United States, because of the First Amendment forbidding the government establishment of religion, all churches are by definition free churches. However, many churches in the United States have requested tax-exempt status under section 501c3 of the Internal Revenue Code. This subjects the churches to certain additional regulations to maintain the tax exemption. Churches that are structured under 501(c)(3) face restrictions in the area of political speech: no substantial part of the church's activities may consist of carrying on propaganda or otherwise attempting to influence legislation. A 501(c)(3) organization is also restricted from participating or intervening in any political campaign for or against any political candidate.

Germany 
In Germany, Protestant churches outside the Evangelical Church in Germany are put under a common label of, and collectively referred to, as "free churches" or "Protestant free churches". This includes relatively new denominations like Baptists, Methodists, etc., as well as older ones like the Mennonites and Evangelical Lutheran Free Church (Germany).

China 
Pew Research Center estimated in early 2010s that China has 35 million independent Protestants (mainly in house churches) and 3.3 million underground Catholics.

Sweden 
In Sweden, the term free church often means any Christian Protestant denomination that is not part of the Church of Sweden, which was the Swedish state church up to 1 January 2000. This includes Baptists, Pentecostals, Methodists, etc.

List of denominations bearing the name "Free Church"

Europe
 Evangelical Lutheran Free Church

England
 Free Church of England

Germany
 Evangelical Lutheran Free Church (Germany)
 Independent Evangelical-Lutheran Church
 Union of Evangelical Free Church Congregations in Germany
 Altapostolische Kirche (see Old Apostolic Church)

Iceland
Reykjavík Free Church
Hafnarfjordur Free Church

Northern Ireland
Free Presbyterian Church of Ulster

Norway
Evangelical Lutheran Free Church of Norway

Scotland
Free Church of Scotland (1843–1900)
Free Church of Scotland (post-1900)
Free Presbyterian Church of Scotland (post-1893)
Free Church of Scotland (Continuing)

South Africa
New Apostolic Church
Old Apostolic Church

Ukraine
Baptists in Ukraine
Evangelical Baptist Union of Ukraine
Shtundists

United States
Lutheran Free Church, 1897 to 1963
Association of Free Lutheran Congregations, 1962–present
Evangelical Covenant Church
Evangelical Free Church of America

See also 
 Free Presbyterian Church (disambiguation)
 Free Church Federation
 Separation of church and state
Powers Church, in Steuben County, Indiana, near Angola, also known as Free Church and listed as that on the U.S. National Register of Historic Places (NRHP)
Evangelical Free Church of America, Southbridge, Massachusetts, NRHP-listed
First Congregational Free Church, Oriskany Falls, New York, NRHP-listed
Free Church Parsonage, Rhinecliff, New York, NRHP-listed
Free Church of the Good Shepherd, Raleigh, North Carolina, NRHP-listed
 Independent Catholicism

Notes

External links 
 Where did Separation of Church and State originate?
The Free Church of Christ – Home Page
The Free Church of England – Home Page

Christian terminology
Protestantism